Central Station (also known as Network Gaming Service) was an online service by Sony Computer Entertainment Europe for PAL regions in the PlayStation 2 era.

The service allowed users to have friend lists, view new game releases, read the latest PlayStation-related news, enter events, and play Central Station-integrated online games for the PlayStation 2 and PlayStation Portable consoles. The service acted as a Sony official alternative to middleware like GameSpy but with extra features similar to Xbox Live or PlayStation Network.

The Central Station portal could be accessed via a Network Access Disc which would be used to set up an internet connection.

Central Station was superseded by the worldwide PlayStation Network upon release of the PlayStation 3. It is unclear when it was discontinued.

History 

The overall history of Central Station is unclear due to very limited documentation. However, multiple Network Access Discs have been dumped and preserved online. These discs show that Central Station went through at least two major UI/Branding changes outside of beta testing.

Around November 2004, Sony gave out new discs to registered users. These discs included a new settings UI, a new Central Station portal, and Hardware: Online Arena.

The Central Station middleware seems to have been used on some PlayStation Portable games as-well, although no evidence exists showing that users could access the Central Station portal on PlayStation Portable consoles.

A beta disc known as "Mirage" was dumped online that has a very rough sketch of the Central Station UI, alongside was a scanned document that was released on a Tumblr blog indicating that British Telecom worked with Sony Computer Entertainment Europe to integrate H.264 streaming into the Network Access Discs.

Usage 
Central Station required users to register their console with two to three different codes depending on the console's model. These would mainly consist of a Network Access Code (included in the disc or console packaging), the Console Model Number, and the Network Adapter Serial Number. After going through the registration process, users would receive a PIN code in the mail that could be entered on the console or on the Network Gaming Service website.

Supported Games 
All of the games that support Central Station are published by Sony Computer Entertainment or a similar subsidiary:

See also
DNAS
PlayStation Network
PlayOnline
Xbox Live
Nintendo Wi-Fi Connection

References

External links
Network Gaming Service

Online video game services
PlayStation (brand)